Cory Gathercole (born 2 December 1986 in  Irymple, Victoria) is a former motorcycle speedway rider from Australia.

Career
Gathercole first came to British speedway when he joined the Swindon Robins squad in the Elite League for the 2007 Elite League speedway season.

He rode for Isle of Wight Islanders and Somerset Rebels before joining the Plymouth Devils in the British Premier League.

Has represented Australia at Under-23 level.

World Longtrack Championship
Qualifying Round

2012- 7th at Tayak (France)
2013- 18th at Marianske Lazne (Czech Republic)

References

1986 births
Living people
Australian speedway riders
Isle of Wight Islanders riders
Plymouth Devils riders
Somerset Rebels riders
Swindon Robins riders